Alejandro Menchaca Lira (31 August 1903 – 21 July 1974) was a Guadeloupean clergyman and bishop for the Roman Catholic Diocese of Temuco. He was born in Concepción, Chile. He became ordained in 1927. He was appointed bishop in 1941. He died on 21 July 1974, at the age of 70.

References

20th-century Roman Catholic bishops in Chile
1903 births
1974 deaths
People from Concepción, Chile
Roman Catholic bishops of Temuco